The Jobaria Defense Systems Multiple Cradle Launcher, also called Jahanam Launcher, is an Emirati made multiple rocket launcher unique to the United Arab Emirates Army. It has 240 tubes making it the world's largest rocket artillery by tube count. It is thought to function as a combined form of BM-21 Grad multiple rocket launcher. It is developed by a joint venture Al Jaber Land Systems.

Design rationale 
The United Arab Emirates Army made a request for a rocket artillery battery to be mounted on one vehicle, since the army is using six vehicles, most likely BM-21 Grad, and 30 soldiers to do the same. Due to the small number of military personnel of the United Arab Emirates Army, the Multiple Cradle Launcher has an advantage over the use of six vehicles which require a team of 30 men, whereas the Multiple Cradle Launcher only needs a team of three to operate and launching the same number of rockets (240). It has four rocket launchers attached to the trailer each carrying sixty 122mm rockets. The system fires ROKETSAN 122mm T-122 Sakarya rockets fitted with a high-explosive warhead that can be detonated by using either a point detonating fuze or by a proximity fuze. The operator of the system can choose how many and which pods he fires. All rockets can be fired in under two minutes, making the rate of fire 2 rounds per second.

After launching the rockets the system can relocate and continue firing rockets if it had not launched its entire payload or if it had, then be rearmed by a support vehicle in about 30 minutes. The support vehicle has two cranes each reloading two pods of the system.

Variants 
ROKETSAN also developed a Rocket Launcher, which fires both 107mm and 122mm rockets from the same Launcher, making it a Multi-Calibre, Multiple Rocket Launcher.

In February 2017, Al Jaber unveiled its Jobaria TCL (Twin Cradle Launcher) heavy rocket artillery system.

Operators

See also 
 T-300 Kasırga
 Katyusha, BM-13, BM-8, and BM-31 multiple rocket launchers of World War II
 BM-14 140 mm multiple rocket launcher
 BM-27 Uragan 220 mm multiple rocket launcher
 BM-30 Smerch 300 mm multiple rocket launcher
 ASTROS II

References 

Rocket artillery
Rocket launchers